Blaker Mills is an unincorporated community in Greenbrier County, West Virginia, United States. Blaker Mills is located on West Virginia Route 12, northwest of Alderson.

The community was named for the local Blaker family.

References

Unincorporated communities in Greenbrier County, West Virginia
Unincorporated communities in West Virginia